Borulya,  is a Ukrainian surname. Notable people with the surname include:

 Ekaterina Borulya (born 1969), German chess master
 Martin Borulya, Soviet comedy drama film (1953)

Ukrainian-language surnames